El Capitán Pérez (English: Captain Pérez) is a 1946 Argentine black-and-white film directed by Enrique Cahen Salaberry. It was written by Mauricio Rosenthal and Pedro E. Pico based upon the short story of Carlos Octavio Bunge. It premiered on February 7, 1946.

Cast
 Olinda Bozán
 José Olarra
 Alberto Bello
 Francisco de Paula
 Fanny Navarro
 Benita Puértolas
 Patricio Azcárate
 Federico Mansilla
 Darío Cossier
 Carlos Belluci
 Domingo Mania
 Miguel Coiro

References

1946 films
1940s Spanish-language films
Argentine black-and-white films
Films directed by Enrique Cahen Salaberry
1940s Argentine films